Bertincourt is a commune in the Pas-de-Calais department in the Hauts-de-France region in northern France.

Geography
Bertincourt is a farming village located 22 miles (36 km) southeast of Arras at the junction of the D7, D18 and D19 roads.

Population

Sights
 The church of Notre-Dame, rebuilt, like most of the village, after the ravages of World War I.
 The World War I cemetery.

See also
Communes of the Pas-de-Calais department

References

External links

 Bertincourt CWGC cemetery

Communes of Pas-de-Calais